The Carlemanniaceae are a tropical East Asian and Southeast Asian family of subshrub to herbaceous perennial flowering plants with 2 genera.  Older systems of plant taxonomy place the two genera, Carlemannia, and Silvianthus within the Caprifoliaceae or the Rubiaceae.  The Angiosperm Phylogeny Group classification of 2003 places the group in the Lamiales, as a plant family more closely related to the Oleaceae than to the Caprifoliaceae.

References

Further reading
Angiosperm Phylogeny Group (2003). An update of the Angiosperm Phylogeny Group classification for the orders and families of flowering plants: APG II. Botanical Journal of the Linnean Society 141: 399-436 (Available online: Abstract | Full text (HTML) | Full text (PDF)).

Lamiales
Lamiales families